Pec is a municipality and village in Domažlice District in the Plzeň Region of the Czech Republic. It has about 200 inhabitants.

Etymology
The name means literally "furnace".

Geography
It lies in the Upper Palatine Forest.

History
The first written mention of Pec is from 1652, when the construction of iron ore processing blast furnaces and smelters was documented. Around 1805, the smelters were abolished and replaced by glassworks. In the 19th century, the inhabitants made a living mainly by logging and making tools and shoes.

Sights
The landmark of Pec is the Chapel of Saint Procopius. It was built in 1908–1909 and consecrated to the patron saint of lumberjacks. In the municipal office there is the Lumberjack Museum with the industrial history of the village and logging.

On Čerchov there is a stone observation tower, known as Kurz Tower. It was built in 1904–1905.

Notable people
Alphonse Mucha (1860–1939), painter; spent his honeymoon here and created several paintings here

Gallery

References

External links

Villages in Domažlice District